Gaer is the name of a hill in the Black Mountains of the Brecon Beacons National Park in Monmouthshire, south Wales.  It lies at the southern end of the long ridge between the valley of the Grwyne Fawr and the Vale of Ewyas one mile to the north of Bryn Arw and 3 miles northeast of Sugarloaf.  Its summit at 427m above sea level sits within an Iron Age hillfort known as Twyn y Gaer.

Geology
The mass of the hill is formed from the mudstones and sandstones of the Senni Beds formation whilst the upper slopes are formed from the sandstones of the overlying Brownstones Formation.  Both are assigned to the Old Red Sandstone which was laid down during the Devonian period. The southern slopes around Coed y Cerrig have been the subject of substantial landslipping in the past.

Access
The upper part of the hill is designated as open country so freely accessible to walkers. Several public footpaths and unmetalled roads ('green lanes') weave their way around the lower slopes making the hill readily accessible.

See also
List of hillforts in Wales

References

External links
images of Gaer and surrounding area on geograph website

Black Mountains, Wales
Mountains and hills of Monmouthshire
Hillforts in Monmouthshire
Hillforts in the Brecon Beacons National Park
Scheduled monuments in Monmouthshire